The High Sheriff of Wicklow was the British Crown's judicial representative in County Wicklow, Ireland from Wicklow's formation in 1606 until 1922, when the office was abolished in the new Free State and replaced by the office of Wicklow County Sheriff. The sheriff had judicial, electoral, ceremonial and administrative functions and executed High Court Writs. In 1908, an Order in Council made the Lord-Lieutenant the Sovereign's prime representative in a county and reduced the High Sheriff's precedence. However the sheriff retained his responsibilities for the preservation of law and order in the county. The usual procedure for appointing the sheriff from 1660 onwards was that three persons were nominated at the beginning of each year from the county and the Lord Lieutenant then appointed his choice as High Sheriff for the remainder of the year. Often the other nominees were appointed as under-sheriffs. Sometimes a sheriff did not fulfil his entire term through death or other event and another sheriff was then appointed for the remainder of the year. The dates given hereunder are the dates of appointment.  All addresses are in County Wicklow unless stated otherwise.

High Sheriffs of County Wicklow 

1650: William Coddington
1654: John Ponsonby
1656: William Coddington of Holm Patrick
1660: Sir Richard Bulkeley, Bt
1709: John Knox
1707: William Fownes
1713: Kendrick Fownes
1714: Thomas Ryves
1715: George Pendred
1726: William Smyth of Drumcree
1731: Thomas Eaton
1733: William Westby
1734: William Ryves
1735: George Pendred of Saunders Grove
1736: John Stratford, 1st Earl of Aldborough
1737:
1738: Joseph Chamney of Forge, Shillelagh
1739:
1743: Edward Chamney of Knocklow
1749: Ralph Howard, 1st Viscount Wicklow
1750:
1756: Richard Baldwin of The Four Crosses
1757:
1758: James Edwards of the Old Court
1759:
1764: John Ussher
1765: Isaac Simon
1766:
177n: William Westby of High Park
1772: George Carroll of Dublin
1773:
1781: Thomas Acton of West Aston
1782: Hopton Scott of Billygannon
1783: Sir Francis Hutchinson, 1st Baronet of Castlesallagh
1784: The Hon. Richard Wingfield of Powerscourt
1785: Sir James Stratford Tynte, 1st Baronet of Dunlavin
1786: Robert Hodson, later Sir Robert Hodson, 1st Baronet of Tuitestown
1788: Morley Saunders of Saunders Grove
1789: Richard Hornidge of Tulfarris
1791: Arthur Knox of Woodstock
1804: Francis W. Greene
1805: Humphrey Loftus Bland
1805: John Middleton Scott
1806: Edward Westley
1807: James Wall
1807: Edward Westby of High Park
1808: John Blashford
1809: John Knox of Castlerea and Woodstock
1810: George M. John Drought
1811: J. A. Eccles
1812: Charles Tottenham of Ballycurry and New Ross
1813: Robert Howard
1814: John Hornedge
1815: John Stratford Saunders
1816: Daniel Mills King
1817: Francis Hoey
1818: Robert Gunn
1819: John Synge
1820: William Acton
1821: Alexander Carroll of Mountjoy Sq., Dublin
1822: Robert Francis Saunders of Saunders Grove
1823: Thomas Hugo
1824: Robert Holt Truell, of Clomannin
1825: Sir Robert Arair Hodson, 2nd Baronet, of Hollybrook.
1827: William John Westby, jnr of High Park, Hacketstown
1827: Daniel Tighe of Rossanna
1829: Anbrose Upton Gledstanes
1831: Granville Leveson Proby, 3rd Earl of Carysfort
1832: William Parsons Hoey of Dublin
1834: Sir George Frederick John Hodson, 3rd Baronet of Hollybrook
1835: William Gilbert Kemmis of Ballinacor
1836: John Henry Parnell of Avondale, Rathdrum

Victoria, 1837–1901

Edward VII, 1901–1910
1902: Henry Leslie-Ellis of Magherymore.
1904: William Henry Olphert Kemmis of Ballinacor.
1905: Humphrey Loftus Bland of Blandsfort, Queens County.
1906: Craven Henry Clotworthy Wade of Rockfield.
1907: Roger Casement of Cronroe, Ashford.
1909: Lambert John Dopping-Hepenstall of Altidore Castle.
1910: Maurice Falkiner Dennis.

George V, 1910–1936
1911: Stanley Herbert Cochrane, 1st Baronet of Corke Lodge
1913: Charles Annesley Acton
1914: Mervyn Arthur Tynte of Tynte Park, Dunlavin.
1915: Alfred Edward West
1916:
1921: Colonel Joseph Scott Moore
1923: Sir Stanley Cochrane.

References

There is no westby family book dead link.

High Sheriffs of Wicklow
Wicklow
History of County Wicklow